Ellen Moran is the Vice-Chancellor for Strategic Communications and Marketing at the University of Pittsburgh. She previously served as Chief of Staff at the US Department of Commerce under Secretary Gary Locke from April 2009 to August 2011. She previously held the position of White House Communications Director. Her predecessor was Kevin Sullivan, who held the position under the Bush administration.  Prior to her post at the White House, she was executive director of EMILY's List.

Biography

Early life and education
A native of Amherst, Massachusetts, Moran holds a degree in political science and English literature from Wheaton College.

Professional career
Before joining White House staff, Moran was executive director of EMILY's List, where she oversaw the national staff and charted the overall strategic direction of the organisation to provide financial assistance to female candidates in the Democratic Party who take liberal, pro-choice political stances. This was Moran's second tenure at EMILY's List, rejoining the organisation from the AFL-CIO, where she coordinated Wal-Mart corporate accountability activities and served in the Political Department. In 2004, she took a leave of absence from the AFL-CIO to direct independent expenditures for the Democratic National Committee, managing placement of presidential advertising and directed television, radio, mail, and phoning efforts in 20 states. In 2000, Moran directed the Democratic Congressional Campaign Committee's $50 million issue advocacy campaign.

Moran's political experience includes managing campaigns for governor, US Senate, and US House of Representatives; working on the national campaign staff of Tom Harkin's 1992 presidential campaign; helping plan both Clinton inaugurals; and conducting international democracy work in Indonesia for the US Agency for International Development. In 1993, Moran designed EMILY's List's campaign staff training program and served as its first director. Moran also oversaw EMILY's List's first foray into voter mobilisation in 1994.

Obama administration
She was announced as the new White House Communications Director on November 22, 2008.

On April 21, she announced she would resign her post to accept the position of Chief of Staff to the Secretary of Commerce.

University of Pittsburgh
On May 2, 2018, Moran became the Vice-Chancellor for Strategic Communications and Marketing at the University of Pittsburgh.

References

External links

1967 births
Living people
Obama administration personnel
People from Amherst, Massachusetts
University of Pittsburgh staff
Wheaton College (Massachusetts) alumni
White House Communications Directors